Hyalinarcha hyalinalis is a moth in the family Crambidae. It was described by George Hampson in 1896. It is found in Bhutan and on the Andaman Islands.

References

Moths described in 1896
Odontiinae
Moths of Asia